Big Stony Petrel Island is an island game reserve with an area of 7.2 ha, in south-eastern Australia.  It is part of the Petrel Island Group, lying in Bass Strait close to Walker and Robbins Islands in north-west Tasmania.

Fauna
Recorded breeding seabird, shorebird and waterbird species include little penguin, short-tailed shearwater, common diving-petrel, white-faced storm-petrel, Pacific gull, silver gull, sooty oystercatcher, black-faced cormorant, Caspian tern and Cape Barren goose.

References

Islands of Tasmania